Todos Santos Cuchumatán is a municipality in the Guatemalan department of Huehuetenango. It is situated in the Sierra de los Cuchumatanes at an elevation of 2,500 m (about 8,000 ft). The municipality covers an area of approximately 269 km2 and is formed by the town of Todos Santos Cuchumatán, 6 villages, and 69 smaller rural communities, called caserios, parajes, and cantones.  The village of San Martin Cuchumatán is the second largest urbanized centre in the municipality of Todos Santos. San Martin is also the agricultural heart of the Cuchumateca valley which produces crops like potatoes, broccoli and large scale cultivation of coffee on the lower mountain slopes of the municipality.

The population of Todos Santos is predominantly indigenous, of Mayan descent, most of whom still speak the Mayan language of Mam. The town is one of few places in Guatemala where indigenous men still wear their traditional clothing, along with the women.

An annual festival is celebrated on October 31–November 2, and is centered on All Saints' Day on November 1 ("Todos Santos" translates to "all saints" in English). Festivities include traditional dances, marimba music and the famous horse races.  The horse races are often the scene of mayhem and bloodshed due to the riders' penchant to drink alcohol for days leading up to the races even though the mayor banned the selling of hard alcohol in May 2008.

In May 2000, a group of tourists from Japan and a bus driver were attacked by a large mob after members of the group took pictures of local children. The Guatemalan bus driver was doused with gasoline and burned to death, and one member of the Japanese tour group was stoned to death. Two other tourists were injured along with two police officers.

References

Pancorbo, Luis (1989) ""Fiesta en Todos Santos" en "Los viajes del girasol". pp. 141–149. Mondadori, Madrid.

External links
Todos Santos Cuchumatan - photographic essay of the town and its people
Videos of The "Skach Koyl" or the Todos Santos horse race
More Videos of The "Skach Koyl" or the Todos Santos horse race
Commentary and history of The "Skach Koyl" or the Todos Santos horse race

Other resources
Two Crosses of Todos Santos by Maud Oakes, at the Open Library
Beyond the Windy Place by Maud Oakes, at the Open Library
Todos Santos Cuchumantan: Report from a Guatemalan Village
Todos Santos: The Survivors.

Image gallery

Municipalities of the Huehuetenango Department